Esther Hayden (1713–58) was an American poet who is known for her poem A Short Account of the Life, Death and Character of Esther Hayden (1759), written on her deathbed.

Biography and writing 
Hayden was born in 1713. She was the daughter of Samuel Allen and the identity of her mother is unknown. Hayden was married to Samuel Hayden of Braintree, Massachusetts and together they had nine children. She died on February 14 1785 aged 45 after experiencing over a year of serious illness.

Short Account of the Life, Death and Character of Esther Hayden (1759) may have been published as a memorial to Hayden. The volume includes a short testimonial by an anonymous author and a longer tribute by a "near Relative". This near relative describes Hayden as a woman who "strove for Grace and Holiness, / That Christ might be her Part", and who "Appear'd a precious Saint." 

The poem written by Hayden is entitled Composed About Six Weeks Before Her Death, When Under Distressing Circumstances. It consists of a verse of 167 lines dedicated to her family and friends. Like many deathbed statements written at the time, the poem urges them to Christian devotion and expresses concern for their religious character. She also describes her own religious insecurities. She laments her physical and mental pain, her "wasting sickness" and her "fear to die".

Although this is Hayden's only extant work, the poem suggests the hand of an experienced writer.

References 

1713 births
1758 deaths
18th-century American women writers
18th-century American poets
Women religious writers